Bunker Beach is a water park in Coon Rapids, Minnesota, United States, within the  Bunker Hills Regional Park.  It is owned by the Anoka County Parks and Recreation Department.

Attractions

Wave pool
Bunker Beach has Minnesota's largest wave pool.  The pool runs for cycles of 15 minutes on and 10 minutes off, and lifeguards rotate based on the wave pool's state.  It is powered by compressed air and has an average temperature of 73 degrees.

Water slides
Bunker beach has six full sized water slides, four of which are tube slides and two of which are body slides.  A strict height requirement of 48" is enforced.  Next to the "Twisted Towers", where two tube slides and the body slides are, there is a "Wiggly Walk".

Lazy Loop
A lazy river was added to Bunker Beach between the 2009 and 2010 seasons.  Nine hundred feet long, it takes about 9–11 minutes to complete a lap.  throughout the ride, the rider is sprayed with water jets, misters, and other water toys.

Rocky Bay
Rocky Bay, also added between the 2009 and 2010 seasons, is a small pool with two 10-foot Aqua Climb walls and two water basketball hoops.  There is a special chair so that handicapped persons may enter the pool.

Adventure pool
The Adventure Pool is a zero-depth entry pool with a play structure for "all ages".  It has "spray cannons, three slides, and cascading walls of water".  Its maximum depth is two feet.

Sand Play Area (retired)
Bunker Beach has a sandbox are with a small playground, "cranes, gadgets, and fountains of water". It was removed in 2021, and has since been replaced with a badminton net.

Other attractions
Bunker Beach has volleyball courts and several picnic areas. Large cabanas can be rented and provide shade.

Concessions 
Bunker Beach forbids people from bringing in outside food. All food must be purchased in the park from one of two concession stands, the Tidal Wave Cafe or the Breakers Snack Shack.

Event 
The Nickelodeon boy band Big Time Rush, or BTR, performed at Bunker Beach on June 6, 2011. They played such radio hits as "Boyfriend".

References

External links
 Article on Big Time Rush Concert

Buildings and structures in Anoka County, Minnesota
Tourist attractions in Anoka County, Minnesota
Water parks in Minnesota